Roof tiles are designed mainly to keep out rain, and are traditionally made from locally available materials such as terracotta or slate. Modern materials such as concrete, metal and plastic are also used and some clay tiles have a waterproof glaze.

Roof tiles are 'hung' from the framework of a roof by fixing them with nails. The tiles are usually hung in parallel rows, with each row overlapping the row below it to exclude rainwater and to cover the nails that hold the row below. There are also roof tiles for special positions, particularly where the planes of the several pitches meet. They include ridge, hip and valley tiles. These can either be bedded and pointed in cement mortar or mechanically fixed.

Similarly to roof tiling, tiling has been used to provide a protective weather envelope to the sides of timber frame buildings. These are hung on laths nailed to wall timbers, with tiles specially molded to cover corners and jambs. Often these tiles are shaped at the exposed end to give a decorative effect. Another form of this is the so-called mathematical tile, which was hung on laths, nailed and then grouted. This form of tiling gives an imitation of brickwork and was developed to give the appearance of brick, but avoided the brick taxes of the 18th century.

Slate roof tiles were traditional in some areas near sources of supply, and gave thin and light tiles when the slate was split into its natural layers. It is no longer a cheap material, however, and is now less common.

Shapes (profiles) 

Numerous shapes (or "profiles") of roof tiles have evolved.  These include:
 Flat tiles – the simplest type, which are laid in regular overlapping rows.  An example of this is the clay-made "beaver-tail" tile (German ), common in Southern Germany. Flat roof tiles are usually made of clay but also may be made of stone, wood, plastic, concrete, or solar cells.
 Plain clay tiles – The size of the plain clay tile  was originally defined by statute in 1477 during the reign of Edward IV.  These are double-lap tiles made originally from clay but more recently in concrete.  They are specified generally for their aesthetic properties.  The colours were generated through the control of the kiln atmosphere to generate either red, brown or blue tiles depending on the degree of reduction in the kiln. Some tiles are still manufactured in this traditional way.

 Imbrex and tegula – an ancient Roman pattern of curved and flat tiles that make rain channels on a roof.
 Roman tiles – flat in the middle, with a concave curve at one end and a convex curve at the other, to allow interlocking.
 Pantiles – with an S-shaped profile, allowing adjacent tiles to interlock.  These result in a ridged pattern resembling a ploughed field. An example of this is the "double Roman" tile, dating from the late 19th century in England and US.
 Monk and nun tiles, also called mission or barrel tiles – semi-cylindrical tiles laid in alternating columns of convex and concave tiles. Originally they were made by forming clay around a curved surface, often a log or the maker's thigh. Today barrel tiles are mass-produced from clay, metal, concrete or plastic.
 Interlocking roof tiles – similar to pantiles with side and top locking to improve protection from water and wind.
 Antefixes – vertical blocks which terminate the covering tiles of a tiled roof.
Hip tiles are convex-shaped to cover the downward-sloping angle of a hip roof.

History 

Tiled roofs first replaced thatched roofs in ancient Mesopotamia. Although house models from Indus Valley Civilization show that the houses were flat roofed, Harappan sites such as Alamgirpur (dated 2600–2200 BCE) provide evidence of roof tiles. Fired roof-tiles occur from as early as the 3rd millennium BC in the Early Helladic House of the tiles in Lerna, Greece. Debris found at the site contained thousands of terracotta tiles which had fallen from the roof. In the Mycenaean period, roof tiles are documented for Gla and Midea.

The earliest finds of roof tiles in archaic Greece are documented from a very restricted area around Corinth, where fired tiles began to replace thatched roofs at two temples of Apollo and Poseidon between 700 and 650 BC. Spreading rapidly,  roof tiles were within fifty years in evidence at many sites around the Eastern Mediterranean, including Mainland Greece, Western Asia Minor, and Southern and Central Italy. Early roof-tiles showed an S-shape, with the pan and cover tile forming one piece. They were rather bulky affairs, weighing around  apiece – more expensive and labour-intensive to produce than thatch. Their introduction has been explained by their greatly enhanced fire-resistance, which gave desired protection to the costly temples.

The spread of the roof-tile technique has to be viewed in connection with the simultaneous rise of monumental architecture in Ancient Greece. Only the newly appearing stone walls, which were replacing the earlier mudbrick and wood walls, were strong enough to support the weight of a tiled roof. As a side-effect, it has been assumed that the new stone and tile construction also ushered in the end of 'Chinese roof' (Knickdach) construction in Greek architecture, as they made the need for an extended roof as rain protection for the mudbrick walls obsolete.

Production of Dutch roof tiles started in the 14th century when city rulers in Holland required the use of fireproof materials. At the time, most houses were made of wood and had thatch roofing, which would often cause fires to spread quickly. To satisfy demand, many small roof-tile makers began to produce roof tiles by hand. Many of these small factories were built near rivers where there was a ready source of clay and cheap transport.

Tilehanging

Tilehanging or vertical tiling is the construction of a building with roof tiles hung vertically on the sides of the building. It is a popular style used in vernacular and neo-vernacular architecture in Britain.

In China

In China, roof tiles are in use throughout the country on temples and village houses. Both imbrex and tegula and mission tiles are used.

Temples typically use glazed, often ornate tiles and antefixes. The most common traditional colour is orange-yellow.

Old buildings mainly have simple, clay tiles that have been fired in a kiln. Tiled roofs, while once ubiquitous in China, are now used less. One reason for this is that the majority of new houses and apartment buildings in China are built with flat roofs.

Solar tiles

Dow Chemical Company began producing solar roof tiles in 2005, and several other manufacturers followed suit. They are similar in design to conventional roof tiles but with a photovoltaic cell within in order to generate renewable electricity. A collaboration between the companies SolarCity and Tesla produced a hydrographically printed tile which appears to be a regular tile from street level but is transparent to sunlight when viewed straight on.

Solar tiles are suitable for both roof refurbishments and new builds, providing roof coverage as well as providing sustainable electricity.

Gallery

See also 
 Chinese glazed roof tile

References

External links
 Technical note on peg tile restoration work
 

 
Roofs
Tiling
Building materials
Terracotta